Joaquín Bautista Ibáñez (born 5 September 1996) is an Argentine professional footballer who plays as a midfielder for Arsenal de Sarandí.

Career

Club
Ibáñez's career began with Lanús. In July 2016, Ibáñez joined Los Andes of Primera B Nacional on loan. He made his professional debut on 11 September 2016 in a defeat to Atlético Paraná. Overall, Ibáñez made nine appearances, of which only one was a start, before returning to Lanús. On 31 July 2017, Ibáñez joined Argentine Primera División side Arsenal de Sarandí on a permanent transfer. A year later, after not featuring for Arsenal, Ibáñez made a move to join Primera B Metropolitana's Almirante Brown.

In January 2022, Ibáñez returned to his former club Arsenal de Sarandí on a deal until the end of 2022.

International
Ibáñez played at U17 and U20 level for Argentina. In early 2013, Ibáñez featured three times at the 2013 South American Under-17 Football Championship which his nation won on home soil. In late 2013, Ibáñez participated in six matches and scored four goals at the 2013 FIFA U-17 World Cup in the United Arab Emirates. He scored two goals in Group E versus Austria and Canada, and two goals in the knockout stages versus Tunisia and Ivory Coast. He was called up as part of Argentina's training squad for the 2014 FIFA World Cup. He won his seven U20 caps at the 2015 South American Youth Football Championship in Uruguay.

Career statistics
.

Honours
Argentina U17
South American Under-17 Football Championship: 2013

Argentina U20
South American Youth Football Championship: 2015

References

External links

1996 births
Living people
Sportspeople from Santa Fe Province
Argentine footballers
Argentina youth international footballers
Argentina under-20 international footballers
Association football midfielders
Primera Nacional players
Argentine Primera División players
Club Atlético Lanús footballers
Club Atlético Los Andes footballers
Arsenal de Sarandí footballers
Club Almirante Brown footballers